Edward Hide (born 12 April 1937) is a retired multiple classic winning British jockey. He was, for a time at his peak, the sixth most successful jockey in British racing history and remains the ninth most successful jockey over 30 years after his retirement.

During his career he was mainly seen on the northern and Scottish racing circuit. In 1974 he set a record of 137 winners for a jockey based in the north of Britain, a record which stood until Kevin Darley passed it in 1993. Hide was, however, also successful on big race days in the south, his classic race victories being the 1973 Derby on Morston, two 1,000 Guineas – Waterloo (1972) and Mrs McArdy (1977) – and two St. Legers on Cantelo (1959) and Julio Mariner (1978). Other big race victories included the Lincoln (three times), Northumberland Plate, Magnet Cup, November Handicap, Nunthorpe Stakes, July Cup, King's Stand Stakes and the 1967 Ayr Gold Cup on Farm Walk. He was identifiable to racing fans by a toothy grin.

He retired in 1986 after riding 2,593 winners in Britain. Only eight jockeys have ridden more winners in Britain as of 2017, and Hide's total is the highest for a rider who was never British champion jockey. At first, he planned to be a Jockey Club stewards' secretary, but was turned down for the role. Instead, he ended up as agent to Walter Swinburn, followed by a spell as assistant trainer to John Gosden and as a racing manager. He also bred horses, including the winners of around 80 races from a farm near Malton, North Yorkshire. More recently, he was in the news when it was revealed a lifetime racecourse entry badge he had been given after his retirement was surprisingly retracted. His case was taken up by the Professional Jockeys' Association.

His nephew, Philip Hide, was a National Hunt jockey on the southern circuit and became a racehorse trainer after his retirement.

Classic race victories
 Great Britain
 1,000 Guineas – Waterloo (1972), Mrs McArdy (1977)
 Epsom Oaks – Pia (1967)
 Epsom Derby – Morston (1973)
 St. Leger – Cantelo (1959), Julio Mariner (1978)

References

Bibliography
  
  
  

British jockeys
1937 births
Living people
British Champion apprentice jockeys
British racehorse trainers